Polygonum nesomii is a species of flowering plant. Common names for it include sandhill wireweed and largeflower jointweed. The species was first discovered by Small in 1909. The plant is endemic in the U.S. state of Florida.

References

nesomii
Endemic flora of Florida
Plants described in 1909
Flora without expected TNC conservation status